KSID (1340 kHz) is an AM radio station broadcasting a classic country music format. Licensed to Sidney, Nebraska, United States, the station serves the Sidney area and is currently owned by Mike Flood and Andy Ruback, through licensee Flood Communications West, LLC. It features programming from ABC Radio .

History
On May 5, 2021, KSID changed their format from country to classic country, branded as "Cheyenne County Country".

References

External links

Classic country radio stations in the United States
SID